Orchard Road or Orchard Street may refer to:

Geography

Singapore
 Orchard Road, Singapore
 Orchard Road Presbyterian Church, Singapore

United States
 Orchard Road (Illinois), Northeast Illinois, United States
 Orchard Street, Manhattan, New York City, United States

Other uses
 Orchard Street, a novel by Maurice Gee
 Orchard Road (song), 1983 song by Leo Sayer